Mohammadabad-e Gonbaki (also Romanized as Moḩammadābād-e Gonbakī, Mohammad Ābād-e-Gonbakī, Moḩammadābād-e Gonbakī, and Moḩammadābād Gonbakī; also known as Moḩammadābād-e Gonbagī and Moḩammadābād) is a city and capital of Gonbaki District, in Rigan County, Kerman Province, Iran.  At the 2006 census, its population was 128, in 34 families.

References

Populated places in Rigan County

Cities in Kerman Province